Gadhinglaj ([ɡəɖᵊɦiŋɡləd͡z]) is a city in India in the Kolhapur district in the southwest corner of the state of Maharashtra, India. It is located on the banks of the river Hiranyakeshi. It is the Taluka (Tehsil) headquarters of Gadhinglaj Taluka and a subdivision headquarters of the Gadhinglaj Subdivision of the Kolhapur District. It is governed by a municipal council. The rapidly growing city is the third largest in the Kolhapur District, with population of more than 50,000. Places to visit like Samagad fort, temples and beautiful weather. Info. By Vinay Gawali.

Geography
Gadhinglaj is situated on the banks of the Hiranyakeshi river, which originates in the Amboli Ghats mountains. It is located at the border between Maharashtra and Karnataka. Maharashtra State Highway 134 passes through the city. Gadinglaj is the headquarters of South Kolhapur and a sub-district of the Kolhapur District. It is the largest city in South Kolhapur and has enough area and population to be deemed a district.

History
Although the exact date of Gadhinglaj's founding is unknown, ancient texts date the city back to at least 1500 AD. Gadhinglaj was originally a small village near the banks of the Hiranyakeshi River. It was not until 1887, when the Gadhinglaj Municipal Council was formed, that it grew into a town. At that time the official name of the city was Hinglaj. During the 1960s and 1970s, the town expanded into a city and its local government grew correspondingly from a C-class municipal council to B-class municipal council. During the 1970s, Appasaheb Nalawade founded the Gadhinglaj Sugar Factory, which contributed to the city's industrial and agricultural growth. Since 2000, the city has seen a population and economic boom, with its population nearly tripling. It has become one of fastest growing cities in Maharashtra and India. During this time Gadhinglaj also saw a boom in its trade, business, financial, and real estate sectors.

Demographics
As of the 2001 Indian census, Gadhinglaj had a population of 27,185. However, the city and its surrounding areas has since increased to 80,000. Males constitute 51 percent of the population.

Gadhinglaj has an average literacy rate of 80.91 percent, which is higher than the national average of 74.9 percent, with male literacy at 87.51 percent and female literacy at 74.5 percent. The dominant and most widely spoken language is Marathi. However, Kannada is also spoken due to the city's proximity to Karnataka.

Religion
The population of Gadhinglaj is mainly Hindu, with Islam as the largest minority religion. There are also Buddhists, Christians (Bardeskars), Sikhs, and others living in the city.

Culture
The main festivals of Gadhinglaj include the Hindu festivals of Diwali, Ganesh Chaturthi, Vijayadashami, Navaratri and Holi (Festival of Colours).

Civic Administration
The civic administration of the city is managed by the Gadhinglaj nagar palika. It is among the wealthiest municipal councils of its classification in the country. It was founded on 1 August 1887, and oversees construction, health, sanitation, water supply, administration, and taxation in the city. Gadhinglaj is divided into 15 wards: Uparate Galli, Belgudri Colony, Bazaar Peth, Gune Path, Gandhinagar, Ayodhya Nagar, Magdum Colony, Manglewadi, Gaurav Nagar, Kaju Baug, Sadhana Nagar, Yamunanagar, KDCC Bank Colony, Gurukul Nagar, Gijawanenagar, Bhadagaonnagar, and Hiranyakeshinagar.

Gadhinglaj operates its own fire department, the Gadhinglaj Municipal Fire Brigade, which operates a fire engine, tanker truck, ambulance, support vehicle, and hydraulic platform truck. Gadhinglaj Municipality (GMC) is headed by a municipal president who is assisted by a municipal chief officer and council members. The city's electrical supply is managed by the Maharashtra State Electricity Distribution Company Limited (MAHADISCOM). It maintains paved roads and civil facilities through tax revenues collected from various economic sectors.

In 2008, Gadhinglaj was one of the first talukas in India to initiate energy conservation programmes through utilizing solar energy for its street lights.

Economy
Gadhinglaj's major businesses are trade, sugar production, and red chili production. Thanks to its proximity to Goa and Sindhudurg, it serves as a market hub. MIDC is developing heavy and light industry in the area. The trade sector of the city's economy is booming and eclipsed sugarcane and jaggery production as the city's biggest economic segment in 2000. Real estate is another prosperous sector in Gadhinglaj due to the city's booming trading and industrial sectors, ideal location and climate, developed infrastructure, and abundant electricity and water supply. These qualities have led to heavy investment in the city's real estate by outsiders, mainly from Kolhapur, Satara, Pune, Mumbai, and Nagpur.

Gadhinglaj's agricultural sector is known for sugarcane, red chili, jaggery, food grains, and vegetables. Some parts of Sindhudurg district and Goa state heavily rely on Gadhinglaj for food grains and vegetables. Gadhinglaj has also been a major hub for cattle trading for many years. Textiles are also a major business in Gadhinglaj due to its proximity to textile-producing regions. The city is also known for its production of kolhapuri chappal (hand-crafted leather slippers).

Many banks have a strong presence in Gadhinglaj city and the Gadhinglaj Taluka due to its large-scale trading sector and its textile and agricultural industries. Gadhinglaj features major banks including ICICI Bank, Bank of Maharashtra, State Bank of India, Union Bank of India, Bank of Baroda, Bank of India, Federal Bank, Axis Bank, HDFC bank, Indian Overseas Bank, IDBI bank, and various local banks.

MIDC
This industrial area is well connected by road, rail, and air transport to almost all Indian cities. The Karnataka state boundary is just  from this area.

The area has a separate sub-station and an uninterrupted power supply. MIDC has plans for a water supply scheme that would source 3.00 MLD of water from the Gijawane K.T., the main source of which is the Chitri dam on the Hiranyakeshi River. The Grinex company pledged an investment of Rs 320 crores (US$60 million) in a production plant for the manufacturing of fibre pipes for the water supply. Many other small-scale and mid-scale industries have started or pledged to start production in the Gadhinglaj MIDC (GMIDC).

Gandhinagar
Gandhinagar is a planned, upper-class closed development of Gadhinglaj. When it was built in 1980, it became the first planned community in Gadhinglaj. It mainly consists of bungalows and high-rise housing societies. It includes high-class schools and hotels, as well as many other amenities such as a park, gym, community hospital, swimming pool, and community hall. It is governed by the Gandinagar Housing Society Corporation (GHSC).

Expansion of Gadhinglaj City Municipal Limit
In 2010, it was rumoured that the nagar palika of Gadhinglaj City was in process of expanding municipal limits by  towards Mahagaon. This would result in a very large increase in both area and population, with population increasing to 150,000. It would transform the Gadhinglaj Nagar Parished into a 'Class A' Nagar Palika, which would enable it to operate its own municipal public transportation system, among other services. This would improve Gadhinglaj's status as an economic hub in Kolhapur and South Maharashtra.

In 2019, the area limits of Gadhinglaj city were expanded. The surrounding area of Badyachiwadi gram panchayat is now included in the limits of Gadhinglaj city.

Education
The literacy rate in Gadhinglaj city is 89.36%, which is higher than the state average of 82.34%. In Gadhinglaj, the male literacy is around 93.74% while female literacy rate is 85.03%. Gadhinglaj includes some of the most reputable educational institutions in India, and it serves as an educational hub in Maharashtra and India as a whole. Some of Gadhinglaj's educational institutions include:
 Sarvodaya Vivek Jeevan Vidya Public School
 Omkar Education Society's Arts, Commerce and Science College, Gadhinglaj
 D. K. Shinde College of Education (B.Ed.) Gadhinglaj
 Late Kedari Redekar Public School
 Chhatrapati Shivaji Vidyalaya
 Creative Pre-Primary School
 Creative Primary School
 Creative High School
 Creative Jr. College Of Science
 Barrister Nath Pai Vidyalaya
 V.D. Shinde High School
Shivraj College of Arts & Commerce and D.S. Kadam Science College.
 Gadhinglaj High school and Jr College
 Sadhana High School and College
 Lotus English School Gadhinglaj
 Jagruti High School and Jr. College
 Sadhana Vidyalaya,
 Dr. Ghali College
 M.R. High School and Jr College
 Sant Gajanan Maharaj Rural Polytechnic College
 Sant Gajanan Maharaj College Of Engineering
 Sant Gajanan Maharaj College of Pharmacy and Medical
 Kedari Redekar Ayurvedic College
 E.B. Gadkari Homeopathy College
 Dr. A. D. Shinde Institute of Technology
 Roots and Wings, Early Childhood Education (Montessori based Pre-school) 
 Neora High School
 Kalu Mastar Vidyalaya

Sai international School
New horizon School

Tourist attractions in Gadhinglaj

 Amboli, Sindhudurg
 Shree Somlingeshwar Temple, Madhyal (6 km)
 Jotiba Temple, Kadgaon (4 km away)
 Kalbhairav Temple
 Mahalaxmi Temple
 St. Anthony Church, Church Road Gadhinglaj
 Shri. Chaloba Temple Kadal (12 km Away)
 Ramling Temple, Virbhadra Temple, Laxmi Temple, Hanumaan Temple, and others around the town of Halkarni
 The Samangad Fort, which belongs to the seventh Rasrakuta king Dantidurga or Dantivarma II, bears date sak 675 (A.D. 733-54)
 River Hiranyakeshi
 Pargad (The hill Fort) around 75 km
 Kasturba garden
 Tilak garden
Rajarshi Shahu gardenShendri lake
 Nakshatra Garden
 Chitri Dam (near Ajra)
 Laxmi Temple, Basarge
 Kalavati Devi temple (Hari mandir), Chidambarnagar
 Guddai Temple, Bhadgaon
 Pant Maharaj Mandir, Mugali
 Sai Temple, Lokamany tilak Udyan
 Shri Kalleshwar Devasthan, Bhadgaon
 Shri Guddadevi Mandir, Bhadgaon
 Shri Kedarling Mandir, Gijawane
 Shri Mahlaxi Mandir, Atyal
 Mangai dam, Atyal
 Shrimant Shri L. V. Desai (Bhadgaonkar Inamdarso) (Historical Place) Wada in Bhadgaon.
 Kadal Lake
 Shri Mangaidevi Temple Hiralage
 Shri Jotibha Temple Hiralage
 Shri Amruteshwer Temple Ningudage (11 km)
 Ganesh Temple, Inchnal
 Shri Ramlingeshwar Temple, Hebbal Kanool (7 km)

 Shri Sant Balumama Temple, Gadhinglaj

Sports
Gadhinglaj City has many sports facilities. These include a football stadium, numerous cricket grounds, and two sports complexes (one managed by the Municipal Council and the other by the Gadhinagar Housing Society Corporation). Both sports complexes include facilities for football, cricket, badminton, tennis, basketball, track, and swimming. The GHSC-run complex also includes an Olympic-sized swimming pool.

Football is the most popular sport in Gadhinglaj. It has been played in the city since 1920. At the high school/college level Maharani Radhabhai High School (M.R.) is the strongest team in Kolhapur district.

Ajit Krida Mandal started the tradition of the Interstate football tournament in Gadhinglaj on Diwali vacation. He organized this tournament for 20 years. After 1984, the Gadhinglaj Soccer Association and the Gadhinglaj Taluka Football Association maintained this Interstate tournament tradition. In 2004, the Gadhinglaj United Football Association took charge of organizing this tournament tradition.

Gadhinglaj United upgrade the standard of tournament to all India level. Teams participating in the tournament include SBI Kerala, Goa Sporting Club, Pune Football Club, Bangalore's Hindustan Aeronautics & Bharat Earth Moving Limited (BEML) teams, the Karnataka Police team, and Mumbai's Oil Natural Gas Corporation team, which have participated in the tournament for the last 11 years.

Transportation
Gadhinglaj is connected to the rest of Maharashtra and India by the state highway system. MSRTC has regular bus service from Kolhapur city.

Distances to nearest major airports
 Dabolim Airport (Goa International Airport) : 
 Belgaum Airport : 
 Kolhapur Airport : 

The nearest railway stations are located in Belgaum to the south, Ghataprabha to the east, Kolhapur to the north, and Savantwadi to the west.

See also
Kaulage
 Narewadi
 Kadgaon
 Nesari
 Mahagaon, Gadhinglaj
 Harali
 Mugruwadi
 Halkarni
 Terani
 Gadhinglaj Taluka
Bhadgoan
Waghrali
Ainapur
Hiralage
Harali Kh
Harali Bk

References

Cities and towns in Kolhapur district
Talukas in Maharashtra